El Kettar Cemetery is one of the most famous cemeteries in Algeria. It is situated in a suburb of the city of Algiers in the commune of Oued Koriche. It opened in 1838 replacing the cemetery of Sidi Abderrahmane destroyed in 1830. It was previously known as Dar El Ghrib (the unknown's residence) since foreigners of the city's limit were buried there. The current name, El Kettar (distillery in Arabic), is due to the distillation of jasmine in the Bridja, a funeral monument dating from the Ottoman era. It was built on a steep hill cemetery, because at the time of colonization, the French authorities forbade Muslims to bury their dead in flat terrain.

It comprises tombs of numerous Algerian notables and it is one of the most preferred place for actors and actresses and other artists (opera singers, musicians, painters, sculptors, architects, writers, poets). It also includes the tombs of several scientists, academicians and sportspeople.

The cemetery also contains paintings by Émile Gaudissard.

Notable interments

 , politician and martyr.
 , politician and martyr.
 El Hadj M'Hamed El Anka, singer and composer
 Mustapha El Anka, musician and actor
 Dahmane El Harrachi, singer
 Amar Ezzahi, singer and mandole player
 Fadela Dziria, singer
 Hadj M'rizek, singer
 Hadj Bouchiba, musician
 Hsissen, singer
 Hamdane Sfindja, sports journalist
 Mohamed Hattab a.k.a. Habib Réda, basketball player, actor and revolutionary
 Mustapha Toumi, composer
 Marie-Josèphe Dublé, wife of Frantz Fanon
 Rouiched, actor
 Mohamed Boudia, activist, playwright and journalist
 Rachid Ksentini, actor and singer
 Kaddour Belkaïm, secretary of the Algerian Communist Party
 Bachir Ridouh, psychiatrist
 Redouane Osmane, trade unionist
 Djamel Keddou, football player
 Keltoum, actress
 Kheireddine Ameyar, founder of La Tribune newspaper
 Allal Ouaguenouni, football player
 Arezki Hammoutène, athlete
 Mouloud Djazouli, leader of the MC Alger

Note: This list is very far from complete: the number of notables buried here exceeds 10,000.

Bibliography

See also
 Cemeteries of Algiers

References

External links
 El Kettar, Alger Etching by Adolphe Beaufrère
 
 Ref at p. 70 in Albert Camus's Carnets

Cemeteries in Algeria
Religion in Algeria
1838 establishments in Algeria
19th-century architecture in Algeria